Helen Mayhew is a British radio presenter and producer, specialising in jazz music.  Mayhew started with the BBC, and then moved to 102.2 Jazz FM at its launch, then rejoined the BBC where she presented her own weekly show, and finally returned to the relaunched Jazz FM. She is also vice-president of the National Youth Jazz Collective.

Early career

Mayhew's broadcasting career began at BBC Radio Devon and BBC Radio Kent, presenting and producing a wide range of programmes.  She was one of the original presenters on Jazz FM when it began broadcasting in 1990, where she devised & presented the Dinner Jazz programme, broadcast on weekday evenings from 7–9 pm.

Also at Jazz FM, she presented and produced many other programmes including blues, jazz-dance music, new releases, and Latin music.

BBC

Mayhew joined BBC Radio 2 in July 2004, presenting the Monday evening Big Band Special, Mondays 10-10.30 pm featuring the BBC Big Band. In September 2004, she took over her own weekly show, which she described as "A chill-out zone with a difference featuring music perfect for dreaming away the small hours.  This aired every Saturday night/Sunday morning from 1–4 am.

Mayhew also occasionally presented the Jazz Line Up programme on BBC Radio 3, on Saturdays from 4–5 pm.

theJazz and Classic FM

Her roles on Radio 2 ended in April 2006, and made her final appearance on Radio 3 in February 2007.  She joined GCap-owned theJazz in April 2007.  She then went on to be heard on Classic FM every Monday-Friday from 12 midnight-2 am presenting the now defunct Classic FM Jazz programme.

Current work
Mayhew came back to the relaunched Jazz FM in 2009 to co-present the Dinner Jazz programme with Sarah Ward, which expanded to six nights a week and is currently broadcast between 7 pm and 10 pm.

In addition to her 'day-job' in radio, she is also a club DJ, playing jazzy dance music.

References

External links
 True Brit with Helen Mayhew on Jazz FM
 Late Night Jazz with Helen Mayhew on Jazz FM

British radio DJs
British radio personalities
Jazz radio presenters
Year of birth missing (living people)
Living people